Larry Page (born Leonard Davies, c. 1938, in Hayes, Hillingdon, Middlesex) is an English former pop singer and record producer of the late 1950s, 1960s and early 1970s.

Biography
After changing his name to Larry Page in honour of Larry Parks, the star of The Jolson Story (1946), the teenager began a recording career as a singer.

Page tried to magnify his fame through the wearing of unusually large spectacles, as "Larry Page the Teenage Rage". The title was originally coined by Jack Bentley, the showbusiness correspondent from The Sunday Pictorial. He toured the United Kingdom with Cliff Richard and appeared at top venues, including the Royal Albert Hall. He was a regular on television programmes such as Six-Five Special and Thank Your Lucky Stars.

He later became a successful manager, record producer and record label owner. Much of his producer/manager success centered on his efforts with The Kinks and The Troggs, and his ownership of Page One Records and Penny Farthing Records. He produced such hits as "Wild Thing" along with all the other hits by The Troggs. Apart from The Troggs and The Kinks, the Larry Page Orchestra gave Jimmy Page (later of Led Zeppelin) some early exposure when he played on Kinky Music. In June 1967, the British music magazine NME reported that Page's bid to retain his former 10% interest in the Kinks had been dismissed by London's High Court.

He was the producer on Daniel Boone's charting single "Beautiful Sunday". In 1972, Page was also involved in producing a song for Chelsea F.C. The song, "Blue is the Colour", is still played at the end of home matches.
 
As of the 2000s, Page has been living in Avoca Beach, New South Wales, Australia.

References

External links
 Career overview by Richie Unterberger at AllMusic
 Page One Records album discography
 Larry Page Productions

1938 births
Living people
People from Hayes, Hillingdon
English male singers
English pop singers
English record producers
English businesspeople